San Marco Evangelista is a comune (municipality) in the Province of Caserta in the Italian region Campania, located about  northeast of Naples and about  south of Caserta.

San Marco Evangelista borders the following municipalities: Capodrise, Caserta, Maddaloni, Marcianise, San Nicola la Strada.

References

Cities and towns in Campania